The 1973 New York City Marathon was the 4th edition of the New York City Marathon and took place in New York City on 4 September.

Results

Men

Women

References

External links

New York City Marathon, 1973
Marathon
New York City Marathon
New York City